Vrajesh Hirjee (born 2 February 1971) is an Indian film and television actor. He is also a script writer,dubbing artist and doing commentary in vivo pro kabbadi league season 9.  He has acted Hindi language films like Rehna Hai Tere Dil Mein, Kaho Naa Pyaar Hai, Mujhe Kucch Kehna Hai, Golmaal Returns and Tum Bin.

He was last seen in a stand-up comedy show Goodnight India that premiered on Sony SAB.

Early life 
Vrajesh was born in London, but brought up in Mumbai, India. He made his debut as a stage artist in the year 1998. Rehnaa Hai Terre Dil Mein, Yeh Hai Mumbai Meri Jaan, Krishna Cottage, Heyy Babyy, and Krrish 3 are some of the notable films he acted in. He is best known for his role of Pandurang in Golmaal: Fun Unlimited and Pandu (Nagbaba) in the fourth installment of the Golmaal franchise Golmaal Again.

Apart from working as a dubbing artist in Hollywood movies like Johnny English Reborn and Pirates of the Caribbean, Vrajesh has shown up in many television shows like Sorry Meri Lorry and Jassi Jaissi Koi Nahin. He was also seen in the sixth season of reality television game show Bigg Boss.

Personal life
Vrajesh Hirjee comes from the field of advertising having worked with top advertising agencies like Everest as a copywriter. He has a sister, Pushtiie Shakti, also a television actress. He is an AIESEC Alumnus. Hirjee married actor Rohini Banerjee in 2015, with whom he has a son born in 2019.

Filmography

Film

Television

Dubbing roles

Live action films

Animated films

See also
 Dubbing (filmmaking)
 List of Indian dubbing artists

Awards

References

External links
 

Living people
21st-century Indian male actors
Indian male television actors
Male actors in Hindi cinema
Indian male stage actors
Indian male voice actors
Gujarati theatre
Place of birth missing (living people)
Bigg Boss (Hindi TV series) contestants
1971 births